Neardonaea is a genus of moths in the subfamily Arctiinae. It contains the single species Neardonaea metallica, which is found in Venezuela.

References

Natural History Museum Lepidoptera generic names catalog

Lithosiini